The 2007–08 Georgia Tech Yellow Jackets men's basketball team plays college basketball for the Georgia Tech Yellow Jackets in the National Collegiate Athletic Association. The head coach was Paul Hewitt who led the team to a 15–17 record overall (7–9 in the Atlantic Coast Conference).

Roster 
Information from 2007-08 roster, subject to change.

Schedule

References 

Georgia Tech Yellow Jackets men's basketball seasons
Georgia Tech
Georgia Tech Yellow Jackets
Georgia Tech Yellow Jackets